Franco-Mauritians are an ethnic group from Mauritius who trace their ethnic ancestry to France and ethnic French people. Franco-Mauritians make up approximately 2% of the country's population.

Origins
The first French settlers arrived in Mauritius (then Isle de France) in 1722, after the previous attempts of settlement by the Dutch had failed, and the island had once again become abandoned. They lived and prospered on the island, ruling it until the British invasion of 1810. The French by now strongly identified with the island, and the terms of capitulation allowed the settlers to live on as a distinct Francophone ethnic group for the next 158 years under British rule before Mauritius attained independence. By 1920 the French Mauritian population on the island was between 70,000 to 80,000, around 20% of the total population.

Not all Franco-Mauritians have pure French lineage; many also have British or other European ancestors that came to Mauritius and were absorbed in the Franco-Mauritian community or the gens de couleur (Coloureds). Within the Afro-Creole community, a significant proportion of them have some degree of French lineage.

Demographic factors
Franco-Mauritians comprise 2% of the population of Mauritius and own many of the largest businesses in the country. Most Franco-Mauritians are Roman Catholic.

The Franco-Mauritians, a dominant minority 
The Franco-Mauritian group was conceptualized as a dominant minority by French political analyst Catherine Boudet. According to the researcher, the Franco-Mauritians minority sought to legitimize its dominant position and maintain its identity threatened under the challenge of decolonisation, by resorting to emigration to South Africa. The designation of the group as « Franco-Mauritian » indicates a plurality of social meanings and reveals the ambivalent positioning of the group within the multiethnic society of Mauritius after the shattering of the colonial order by independence. Dominant ethnicity in Mauritius traces its roots in the system of slavery of the 18th century which conferred to the minority of French descent a structural dominant position based on race in the colonial society. The economic and political hegemony of the group was further strenghtened by its acquisition of the monopoly over the sugar industry throughout the 19th century. However, group identification shifted from a racially-based to an ethnically-based following the massive introduction of Indian immigrants. The Franco-Mauritian domination was eventually challenged by the rise of economic and political elites within the other groups of the Mauritian plural society, and by the independence granted in 1968 when the political power went to the Hindu majority. Emigration to South Africa then appeared as the ultimate strategy for many Franco-Mauritians to allow them retain their dominant position and identity.

Notable people
 Angry Anderson, rock singer-songwriter, television presenter-reporter and actor
 Claude de Baissac
 Lise de Baissac
 Joanna Bérenger, politician
 Paul Bérenger, former Prime Minister of Mauritius
 Benoit Bouchet, windsurfer
 Havana Brown, Mauritian-Australian DJ, singer, recording artist, record producer, songwriter and dancer
 Antoine Toussaint de Chazal, plantation owner and artist
 Enzo Couacaud, Mauritian-born French Tennis Player
 Adrien d'Épinay, politician and slave-owner
 Prosper d'Épinay, sculptor and caricaturist 
 Laurina Fleure, Australian Model and TV Personality
 Andrew Florent Australian tennis player
 Oliver Florent Australian rules footballer
 Firoz Ghanty, painter, poet, and activist
 Genevieve Gregson, Australian Athlete

 Marie Leblanc, writer
 J. M. G. Le Clézio, a French author of Franco-Mauritian origins awarded the 2008 Nobel Prize in Literature.
 Chad le Clos, Swimming, representing South Africa
 Francoise Lionnet, professor
 Amédée Maingard, war hero, politician and businessman 
 Alfred de Marigny, author 
 Jean-Paul de Marigny, footballer, Football Manager, former Socceroo
 Virgile Naz, lawyer and politician 
 Françoise Pascal, actress, singer, dancer, fashion model, and producer
 Charles Thomi Pitot, politician
 Pierre De Sornay, writer
 Auguste Toussaint, archivist and author 
 Alix d'Unienville, spy, war hero and author
 Corinne Leclair, swimmer, represented Mauritius at 1992 Summer Olympics
 Veronique Marrier D'Unienville, archer, represented Mauritius at 2008 Summer Olympics
 Heather Arseth, swimmer, represented Mauritius at 2012 and 2016 Summer Olympics
 Marie-Hélène Pierre, badminton player
 Aurelie Halbwachs, cyclist, represented Mauritius at 2008 and 2012 Summer Olympics
 Yannick Lincoln, cyclist
 Marinne Giraud, tennis player
 Rémi Feuillet, judoka
 Priscilla Morand, judoka
 Camille Koenig, swimmer

See also
 Mauritian of Indian origin
 Mauritian of African origin
 Mauritian of Chinese origin

References

 
Ethnic groups in Mauritius
Mauritius